The 2012 Arena Football League season was the 25th season in the history of the league. The regular season began on March 9, 2012 with a game between the Pittsburgh Power and the Orlando Predators and ended on July 22, 2012 with a game between the Utah Blaze and Philadelphia Soul. The Arizona Rattlers defeated the Philadelphia Soul by a 72–54 score in ArenaBowl XXV on August 10, 2012 to conclude the playoffs.

League business

Teams
The only franchise that relocated during the offseason was the Tulsa Talons, which became the San Antonio Talons following a move to San Antonio, Texas, where the team announced they would play at the Alamodome.

When the 2012 schedule was announced, the Dallas Vigilantes were left off without any explanation on the status of the franchise. No expansion teams were added for the 2012 season.

Labor issues
On March 9, 2012, the day the AFL was to begin play, the Arena Football League Players Association went on strike, seeking a doubling of their wages. The game between the Pittsburgh Power and Orlando Predators scheduled for that night was played as scheduled with replacement players making up about three-quarters of the roster. However, players began crossing the picket line by the second quarter and the AFL announced the work stoppage ended just two hours after the game ended.

For the second game of the 2012 season, the entire roster of the San Antonio Talons voted unanimously not to strike for its first game against the Utah Blaze.

On June 8, the Cleveland Gladiators were forced to forfeit a week 14 matchup against the Pittsburgh Power when they were unable to field enough players to play as a result of several of their players going on strike. It was the first forfeited game in the history of the league. This news came after the NFL Network chose not to air a contest between the Milwaukee Mustangs and Philadelphia Soul in the network's weekly Friday night broadcast, citing a "labor uncertainty." In the following week, after reports of a potential lockout rose, the NFL Network chose to air a War on I-4 game between the Tampa Bay Storm and the Orlando Predators via tape delay on June 16, the day after the game took place.

On June 17, it was announced that the AFL and the AFLPU agreed to a multi-year collective bargaining agreement, to be signed on June 20.

Regular season standings

Eight teams qualified for the playoffs: four teams from each conference, of which two are division champions and the other two have the best records of the teams remaining.
 Green indicates clinched playoff berth
 Blue indicates division champion
 Gray indicates division champion and conference's best record

Tie-breakers
 Milwaukee finished in third place in the East Division based on a head-to-head sweep over Pittsburgh.
 New Orleans clinched the American Conference's No. 4 seed based on a greater won-loss percentage among games between New Orleans, Tampa Bay, and Cleveland. (New Orleans: 2–1, Tampa Bay: 2–2, Cleveland: 1–2)
 San Jose clinched the National Conference's No. 3 seed based on their greater point differential in head-to-head competition with Utah.

Playoffs

Conference semifinals

Conference championships

ArenaBowl XXV

All-Arena team

References